Jansky is a lunar impact crater that lies along the eastern limb of the Moon. It was named after American physicist Karl Jansky. It lies due east of the larger walled plain Neper, along the southern edge of the Mare Marginis. Due to its location, this crater is viewed from the side from Earth, limiting the amount of detail that can be observed. The visibility is also affected by libration, which can completely conceal this formation from view.

This is a worn crater with an eroded rim. The southern part of the rim in particular is disrupted and irregular in form, with a pair of small craters along the inner wall. The remainder of the rim is roughly circular. The interior floor is relatively featureless, except for a few small craters.

Satellite craters
By convention these features are identified on lunar maps by placing the letter on the side of the crater midpoint that is closest to Jansky.

References

External links

 LTO-63B3 Jansky — L&PI topographic map

Impact craters on the Moon